Breece D'J Pancake (b. Breece Dexter Pancake, June 29, 1952 – April 8, 1979) was an American short story writer. He is said to be "one of the greatest authors you've never heard of" according to an article on his work in Study Breaks. Pancake was a native of West Virginia. Several of his short stories were published in The Atlantic Monthly and other periodicals during his lifetime.

Pancake died of suicide on Palm Sunday, 1979, at the age of 26. His motives for suicide are still somewhat unclear but many speculate the death of his father to alcoholism and the death of his close friend from a gruesome car accident could have had an influence on his choices—his writing style could also prove he was living a haunted life.

Biography

Early life and education (1952–1974) 

Breece Dexter Pancake was born and raised in Milton, West Virginia, the youngest child of Clarence "Wicker" Pancake and Helen Frazier Pancake and brother of two sisters. His hometown of Milton is recognized as the home of handmade Blenko glass and called the 'chemical valley' because of its high industrial activity. Milton is also said to be Pancake's inspiration for the fictionalized settings of his stories.

Growing up in Milton, Pancake's best friend was Rick Blenko. During his childhood, Pancake would spend time listening to conversations between older men and older women which influenced his writing—he would also spend time eating at soup kitchens with the homeless.

Pancake briefly attended West Virginia Wesleyan College in Buckhannon before transferring to Marshall University in Huntington, where he completed a bachelor's degree in English education in 1974. After graduating from Marshall he spent time in the western United States, visiting his sister in Santa Fe, New Mexico.

Later education 

As a graduate student, he studied at the University of Virginia's creative writing program under John Casey and James Alan McPherson. Pancake also worked as an English teacher at two Virginia military academies, Fork Union and Staunton.

Pancake suffered from feelings of alienation at the University of Virginia. He felt that faculty and staff looked down upon him, despite the fact that the college was so close to his native state. He was, however, a gregarious person who befriended everyone he could. His attachment to alcohol eventually led to further isolation, likely contributing to his depressive state.

Personal life 
He was an avid outdoorsman, who enjoyed hunting, fishing, and camping. Pancake was a devout fan of the music of folk singer Phil Ochs, who had attended Staunton Military Academy, where Pancake later taught.

The unusual middle name "D'J" originated when The Atlantic Monthly misprinted his middle initials (D.J., for Dexter John) in the byline of Trilobites, a short story the magazine published in 1977.  Pancake decided not to correct it. Dexter was Pancake's middle name; he took the name John after converting to Catholicism in his mid-20s.

Suicide 
Pancake died from a self-inflicted gunshot wound in Charlottesville, Virginia. He was buried in Milton, West Virginia.  According to Foster, "One cannot consider Pancake's work without probing his tragic death.  Douglass points out that, in hindsight, there were many indications of Pancake's suicidal longings," such as the act of giving away many personal items, including his guns, with the exception of the Savage over-under shotgun he used to end his life.

Sam Sacks of The Wall Street Journal described Pancake's death as "A Voice Stilled Too Soon," and called his suicide a "tragic mistake," insisting that it was the result of a particularly bad night rather than an inevitable circumstance. Sacks concluded this argument by stating that Pancake's stories, which carry on his legacy, are "heartbreaking not for their potential but for their perfection."

Murphy says, "Pancake has become a semi-mythical figure of American Literature, a hillbilly Hemingway for those few—heavy on writers and academicians—who do know him.  Parts of the myth he created for himself are through the way he lived his life and the foggy circumstances surrounding his death.  The rest of the myth we've created ourselves around the legacy of his extraordinary writing."

Pancake's papers are held at the West Virginia & Regional History Center, the West Virginia University Libraries at West Virginia University and the  Albert and Shirley Small Special Collections Library at the University of Virginia.

Writing 
Pancake published six short stories in his lifetime,  mostly in The Atlantic.  These stories and six more that had not been published at the time of his death were collected in The Stories of Breece D'J Pancake (1983). The volume was reprinted in 2002 with a new afterword by Andre Dubus III.

Style 
According to Alan McPherson (via Gower), "His ambition was not primarily literary: he was struggling to define for himself an entire way of life, an all-embracing code of values that would allow him to live outside his home valley in Milton, West Virginia." His vivid, compact style has been compared to that of Ernest Hemingway. Gower states that his characters were "piercing, beautiful, and even haunting," and that his stories achieved a rare universality stemming from his use of "un-universal characters."

According to Foster, "All of Pancake's stories have a dreamlike quality—they don't explain themselves and they are never unequivocal; readers must make their own interpretations.  His canvas is littered with the old broken-down autos, the detritus of an industrial age—all symbols of blight and sterility."

Content 
Most of his stories are set in rural West Virginia and revolve around characters and naturalistic settings, often adapted from his own past. His stories received acclaim from readers and critics. The Atlantic'''s editor recalled receiving letters that "drifted in for months – asking for more stories – inquiring for collected stories, or simply expressing admiration and gratitude ... in 30-something years at The Atlantic, I cannot recall a response to a new author like the response to this one."

In an issue of the New Yorker, Jon Michaud calls Pancake's characters "both immediately recognizable and pertinent to the present moment." He states that Pancake's work features a host of hard-working characters facing increasingly dire economic circumstances. The point of this, as Michaud states, is to give the audience an idea of the cultural destruction that lies in industrialization's wake.

Blackburn argues that Pancake's works continue an American pastoral tradition. Blackburn states that, "The Stories, written during the 1970s, often depict the landscape of West Virginia as dying, barren, and unwelcoming. The characters who populate his stories are often impoverished, trapped in place, or failures in one way or another." These characters may be viewed as expanding on a common American theme- the struggle with living in "liminal spaces."Cleveland Review of Books said Pancake's "letters reveal a complex figure who loved his home and family, was dedicated to his craft, and was restlessly uncomfortable when not writing, revising, hunting, or fishing." His writing is often considered to be part of the southern “grit lit” movement that includes such writers as Harry Crews, Barry Hannah, and Larry Brown.

 Influences 
Among the writers who claim Pancake as a strong influence are Chuck Palahniuk, author of Fight Club and Andre Dubus III, author of House of Sand and Fog. After Pancake's death, author Kurt Vonnegut wrote in a letter to John Casey, "I give you my word of honor that he is merely the best writer, the most sincere writer I've ever read. What I suspect is that it hurt too much, was no fun at all to be that good. You and I will never know."

The song "River Towns", from Dire Straits' frontman Mark Knopfler's 2015 studio album Tracker, was inspired by Pancake's "A Room Forever", the story of a tugboat mate spending New Year's Eve in an eight-dollar-a-night hotel room where he drinks cheap whiskey out of the bottle and eventually ends up with a teen-aged prostitute.

 Quote 
From a letter to his mother, Helen Pancake, that Pancake wrote in Charlottesville, where he was studying writing:

Awards and honors
 Governor's Fellowship in Fiction Writing from University of Virginia 1976
 Jefferson Society Fiction Award from University of Virginia 1977 
 Hoyns Fellowship for Fiction Writing from University of Virginia 1978
 West Virginia Library Association Annual Book Award 1983 (posthumous)

 References 

 External links 
 Biography from West Virginia Wesleyan College
 Essay on Pancake in Mississippi Review by Cynthia Kadohata
 The complete text of Pancake's "Trilobites"
 The complete text of Pancake's "In the Dry"
 The complete text of Pancake's "The Honored Dead"
 The complete text of Pancake's "Hollow"
 The New York Times Review of The Stories of Breece D'J Pancake by Joyce Carol Oates
 Murphy, Mike. American Myth: The Short, Beautiful Life of Breece D'J Pancake'' 
 Breece D'J Pancake papers at West Virginia University
 Book Review: Ruel Foster, A Room Forever" The Life, Work, and Letters of Breece D'J Pancake by Thomas E. Douglas
 An issue of Appalachian Heritage on Pancake

1952 births
1979 deaths
Schoolteachers from Virginia
American short story writers
Marshall University alumni
People from Milton, West Virginia
People from South Charleston, West Virginia
University of Virginia alumni
Suicides by firearm in Virginia
Writers from West Virginia
Catholics from West Virginia
20th-century American educators
1979 suicides
Appalachian writers